Crassispira takeokensis is a species of sea snail, a marine gastropod mollusk in the family Pseudomelatomidae, the turrids and allies.

Description
The length of the shell attains 21.4 mm.

Distribution
This marine species occurs off Japan found at depths between 740 m and 1030 m.

References

 Otuka, Y., 1949: Fossil Mollusca and rocks of the Kiyosumi group exposed at Minato-machi, Chiba Prefecture, and its environs (1st paper). Japanese Journal of Geology and Geography, vol. 21, nos. 1–4, pp. 295–309, pl. 13.
 Hasegawa, K., Okutani, T. and E. Tsuchida (2000) Family Turridae. In: Okutani, T. (ed.), Marine Mollusks in Japan. Tokai University Press, Tokyo, 619-667
 Hasegawa K. (2009) Upper bathyal gastropods of the Pacific coast of northern Honshu, Japan, chiefly collected by R/V Wakataka-maru. In: T. Fujita (ed.), Deep-sea fauna and pollutants off Pacific coast of northern Japan. National Museum of Nature and Science Monographs 39: 225-383
 Hasegawa K. & Okutani T. (2011) A review of bathyal shell-bearing gastropods in Sagami Bay. Memoirs of the National Sciences Museum, Tokyo 47: 97-144

External links
 Worldwide Mollusc Species Data Base: Crassispira takeokensis

takeokensis
Gastropods described in 1949